Shaneka Jodian Gordon (born 28 May 1986) is a Jamaican footballer who plays as a midfielder for Icelandic club ÍBV. She was a member of the Jamaica women's national team. In 2015, she received an Icelandic citizenship. After missing the 2016 and 2017 seasons due to injury she signed with ÍR for the 2018 season.

College career
Gordon attended the Community College of Baltimore and the University of West Florida, both in the United States.

References

1986 births
Living people
Expatriate women's footballers in Iceland
Expatriate women's soccer players in the United States
Shaneka Gordon
Shaneka Gordon
Shaneka Gordon
Jamaican expatriate women's footballers
Jamaican expatriate sportspeople in Iceland
Jamaican expatriate sportspeople in the United States
Jamaican women's footballers
Jamaica women's international footballers
People from Saint Catherine Parish
Shaneka Gordon
West Florida Argonauts women's soccer players
Women's association football midfielders